Zoltán Varga (born 19 August 1977 in Jászberény) is a Hungarian football player who last plays for Győri ETO FC II.

External links
www.hlsz.hu

1977 births
Living people
People from Jászberény
Hungarian footballers
Hungary youth international footballers
Hungary under-21 international footballers
Budapesti VSC footballers
Tiszakécske FC footballers
Szombathelyi Haladás footballers
Büki TK Bükfürdő footballers
Zalaegerszegi TE players
Győri ETO FC players
Association football goalkeepers
Sportspeople from Jász-Nagykun-Szolnok County